A Htar A Thit Nae Hna Khar Chit Mal is a 2012 Burmese romantic-comedy film, directed by Nyi Nyi Htun Lwin starring Yan Aung, Min Maw Kun, Nay Toe, Soe Myat Thuzar, Kyi Lae Lae Oo, Chit Thu Wai and Wutt Hmone Shwe Yi.

Cast
Yan Aung as U Hla Shein
Min Maw Kun as Htet Phone Shein
Nay Toe as Kyi Thar Oo
Soe Myat Thuzar as Daw Kyi Phyu
Kyi Lae Lae Oo as Daw Mu Yar Pwint
Chit Thu Wai as Moe Thazin
Wutt Hmone Shwe Yi as Mya Thway Khett

References

2012 films
2010s Burmese-language films
Burmese romantic comedy films
Films shot in Myanmar